Air One, which shut down its operations by 30 October 2014, used to serve the following destinations as of June 2014:

References

Lists of airline destinations